Cartosat-2 is an Earth observation satellite in a Sun-synchronous orbit and the second of the Cartosat series of satellites. The satellite was built, launched and maintained by the Indian Space Research Organisation (ISRO). Weighing around 680 kg at launch, its applications will mainly be towards cartography in India. It was launched by the Polar Satellite Launch Vehicle PSLV-C7 launch vehicle on 10 January 2007.

Satellite description 
Cartosat-2 carries a state-of-the-art panchromatic (PAN) camera that take black and white pictures of the Earth in the visible region of the electromagnetic spectrum. The swath covered by this high resolution PAN camera is 9.6 km and their spatial resolution is less than 1 metre. The satellite can be steered up to 45° along as well as across the track. Cartosat-2 is an advanced remote sensing satellite capable of providing scene-specific spot imagery. The data from the satellite will be used for detailed mapping and other cartographic applications at cadastral level, urban and rural infrastructure development and management, as well as applications in Land information system (LIS) and Geographic information system (GIS). The first imagery, received on 12 January 2007, covered a length of 240 km from Paonta Sahib in Shivalik region to Delhi. Another set of imagery of about 50 km length covered Radhanagari to Sagoan in Goa. Analysis of the first imagery received at National Remote Sensing Agency's data reception station at Shadnagar, in Hyderabad, confirmed excellent performance of the on-board camera.

Cartosat-2's panchromatic camera can produce images better than 1 metre in resolution, compared to the 82 cm panchromatic resolution offered by the Ikonos satellite. India had previously purchased images from Ikonos at about US$20 per square kilometre; the use of Cartosat-2 will provide imagery at 20 times lower cost.

End of life 
After 12 years of service in a circular orbit of almost 630 km altitude Cartosat-2 would have taken about 30 years to de-orbit naturally. With 25 kg of propellant remaining it was decided by ISRO's Directorate for Space Situational Awareness and Management (DSSAM) to decommission the spacecraft and lower the perigee using left-over propellant so that it meets United Nations Office for Outer Space Affairs (UNOOSA)'s space debris mitigation guidelines. Between 6 March to 3 September 2020, perigee was lowered incrementally by performing 26 perigee reduction burns putting the spacecraft in 630 × 390 km orbit. This was ISRO's first low Earth orbit satellite to be decommissioned in this manner. Orbit of Cartosat-2 is expected to decay naturally within 10 years.

See also 

 Indian military satellites
 List of Indian satellites

References

External links 
 Cartosat-2 website 

Cartosat
Spacecraft launched in 2007
Spacecraft launched by PSLV rockets
Spacecraft decommissioned in 2019